Joan Whitney Kramer (June 26, 1914 – July 12, 1990) was an American singer and songwriter.

Early years
Kramer was born Zoe Parenteau in Pittsburgh, Pennsylvania. Her early music training came while singing in the choir in her church. She attended Finch College in New York City.

Career
In 1934, while playing a showgirl in The Great Waltz on Broadway, she took the stage name Joan Whitney. She studied voice under Alex Kramer, who later collaborated with her on a number of songs including "Candy", Ain't Nobody Here but Us Chickens, and "Far Away Places". Kramer and Whitney married and had a son, Doren, while living in Forest Hills, New York.

Death
Joan Whitney died on July 12, 1990 in Westport, Connecticut, aged 76, from Alzheimer's disease.

Songs written

with Alex Kramer
"Ain't Nobody Here but Us Chickens" (1946)
"Behave Yourself"
 "Comme Ci Comme Ca" -English lyrics by- Joan Whitney and Alex Kramer -music by- Bruno Coquatrix (1949)
"Deep as the River" (recorded by Harry Belafonte in 1949)
"Far Away Places" (1948)
"High on a Windy Hill" (1940)
 "I Only Saw Him (You) Once" (1947)
"Love Somebody" (1947)
 "Money Is the Root of All Evil (Take It Away Take It Away Take It Away)" (1945)
 "No Man Is an Island"
 "That's The Way It Is" (1945)
 "Why Is It?" (1940)

with Mack David and Alex Kramer
"Candy" (1944)
 "Come With Me My Honey (The Song Of Calypso Joe)" (fox-trot rhumba), song featured by Bob Crosby and His Band in the film Meet Miss Bobby Socks (1944)
"It's Love, Love, Love" (1943)

with Hy Zaret and Alex Kramer
 "I'm Not Afraid" (1952)
 "It All Comes Back To Me Now" (1940)
 "Got A Letter From My Kid Today" (1940)
 "My Sister and I" (1941)
 "So You're The One" (1940)
 "The Doll With A Sawdust Heart" (1951)
"To Be Loved By You" (1952)
 "You'll Never Get Away" (1952)
"Christmas Roses" (1952)

References

External links
Obituary in New York Times

Actresses from Pittsburgh
American women singer-songwriters
American musical theatre actresses
Deaths from Alzheimer's disease
1914 births
1990 deaths
Deaths from dementia in Connecticut
Finch College alumni
20th-century American actresses
20th-century American women singers
20th-century American singers